Deiters' cells, also known as outer phalangeal cells or cells of Deiters, are a cell type found within the inner ear. They contain both micro-filaments and micro-tubules which run from the basilar membrane to the reticular membrane of the inner ear.  

These cochlear supporting cells include a somatic part, with its cupula, and a phalangeal process, which links the Deiters soma to the reticular lamina. The part of the phalanx which is included in the reticular lamina is the apex of the phalanx (phalangeal apex).

The cells are named for neuroanatomist Otto Deiters.

References

Bibliography

 Hall, James W. (2000) Handbook of otoacoustic emissions Singular Publishing 
 O. Deiters (1860) Untersuchungen uber die Lamina spiralis membranacea Henry & Cohen, Bonn

Auditory system